The Guts is a 2013 novel by Irish writer Roddy Doyle. The novel returns to Barrytown where Jimmy Rabbitte, Outspan, and Imelda are 30 years older and have all changed – but not all that much.

Premise
Jimmy Rabbitte is back with some old friends, but time has moved on for all of them. The man who created the soul band, The Commitments, is now forty-seven, with a loving wife, four children, and bowel cancer. He is not dying, he thinks, but he might be.

Reception
The Guts was named Novel of the Year at the 2013 Irish Book Awards in November.

References

2013 Irish novels
Novels by Roddy Doyle
Sequel novels
Novels set in Dublin (city)
Literature about cancer
Jonathan Cape books